is a railway station in the city of Owariasahi, Aichi Prefecture,  Japan, operated by Meitetsu.

Lines

Station layout
The station  has two island platforms connected by an elevated station building. The station has automated ticket machines, Manaca automated turnstiles and is staffed.

Platforms

Adjacent stations

|-
!colspan=5|Nagoya Railroad

Station history
The Seto Electric Railway was absorbed into the Meitetsu group on September 1, 1939. The station was renamed to its present name on November 1, 1971. The station was relocated to its present location, and new station building was completed in July 1994.

Passenger statistics
In fiscal 2017, the station was used by an average of 7,796 passengers daily.

Surrounding area
Nagoya Sangyo University
Owariasahi City Hall
Meitetsu Owari Asahi Rail Yard

See also
 List of Railway Stations in Japan

References

External links

 Official web page 

Railway stations in Japan opened in 1905
Railway stations in Aichi Prefecture
Stations of Nagoya Railroad
Owariasahi, Aichi